Lachnocnema reutlingeri, the Reutlinger's large woolly legs, is a butterfly in the family Lycaenidae. It is found in Ghana, Nigeria, Cameroon, Equatorial Guinea, Gabon, the Republic of the Congo, the Democratic Republic of the Congo, Sudan, and Uganda.

Subspecies
Lachnocnema reutlingeri reutlingeri (Ghana, Nigeria, Cameroon, Equatorial Guinea, Gabon, Congo, western Democratic Republic of the Congo)
Lachnocnema reutlingeri perspicua Libert, 1996 (northern and eastern Democratic Republic of the Congo, southern Sudan, Uganda)

References

External links

Die Gross-Schmetterlinge der Erde 13: Die Afrikanischen Tagfalter. Plate XIII 65 h

Butterflies described in 1892
Miletinae
Butterflies of Africa